Clashnoir is a settlement in Glenlivet, Moray, Scotland, 92 miles north of Edinburgh and 25 miles south of Elgin.

Villages in Moray